MK Publishers is a publisher in Uganda publishing mainly educational books. It largely publishes course books for primary and secondary schools.

History
MK publishers was incorporated in 1995 The Founding CEO is Late Musoke Majwega. The goal was to publish affordable cost educational books and other scholastic materials. Today MK Publishers has published books for most of the primary and secondary school curriculum subjects for Uganda, Rwanda, Kenya, Burundi, Ethiopia and Cameroon.

Publications
Wings That Got Me Soaring
Golden Memories of a Village Belle
Dynamics of Success & Achievement
MK Fundamentals of Economics by Herbert Mutamba Asiimwe
MK Dictionary of Economicsby Herbert Mutamba Asiimwe

Notable authors
Badiru Malimbo Kigundu
Barbara Itungo Kyagulanyi
Livingstone Ssebunya
Herbert Asiimwe Mutamba

References 

Book publishing companies of Uganda
Publishing companies established in 1995
Educational publishing companies
Kumusha